Lauri Gewog (Dzongkha: ལའུ་རི་) is a gewog (village block) of Samdrup Jongkhar District, Bhutan. It was also part of Jomotsangkha Dungkhag (sub-district), together with Serthi Gewog.

References 

Gewogs of Bhutan
Samdrup Jongkhar District